Jezerce is a village in Croatia. 

Populated places in Lika-Senj County